The Thai Pen Thai Party ( Phak Thai Pen Thai, translated as Thais Is Thai Party [sic] or Free Thais Party) is a political party in Thailand. Its original names were Phak Kaset Mahachon (พรรคเกษตรมหาชน) and then Phak Khon Kho Plot Ni (พรรคคนขอปลดหนี้) and then Phak Thai Pen Thai (พรรคไทเป็นไท with different spelling).
At the last legislative elections, 6 February 2005, the party secured 0.6% of the popular vote and could not win any seat out of 500 seats.

The party was dissolved on 30 March 2016.

References

1998 establishments in Thailand
2016 disestablishments in Thailand
Defunct political parties in Thailand
Political parties disestablished in 2016
Political parties established in 1998